Aco Petrović may refer to:

 Aleksandar Petrović (basketball, born February 1959), Croatian basketball coach and former basketball player
 Aleksandar Petrović (basketball, born October 1959) (1959–2014), Serbian basketball coach
 Aco Petrović (politician) (born 1958), Serbian politician

See also 
 Aleksandar Petrović (disambiguation)